Ibrahim M. Ida (born 15 January 1949) was elected Senator for Katsina Central constituency of Katsina State, Nigeria, taking office on 29 May 2007. He is a member of the All Progressives Congress.

Ida obtained an AIB, London (1977), an MSc in Banking & Finance, University of Ibadan (1983) and an LLB, BL, University of Abuja (2003).
Before being elected to the Senate he was Commissioner of Finance, Katsina State and Permanent Secretary, Federal Civil Service.
After election, he was appointed to committees on Rules & Business, Independent National Electoral Commission, Finance and Defence & Army.
Vice chancellor Umaru Musa Yaradua University Katsina.

References

Living people
1949 births
Katsina State
Peoples Democratic Party members of the Senate (Nigeria)
21st-century Nigerian politicians